AutoIndustriya.com is a Philippine-based online automobile magazine. It is considered the longest consistently running independent automotive online publication in the Philippines.

History
AutoIndustriya.com was founded on September 25, 2000 by Brent Co and Benjamin Ngo Jr.

Content
AutoIndustriya.com provides up-to-date automotive industry news as well as car reviews and an automotive discussion forum. The website also has an Auto Shop Guide where users can search for vehicles and services within their area. A car buyers guide featuring more than 700 new vehicles available in the Philippine market was one of the newer features added. The site also covers news and reviews for trucks and buses under the 'Transport & Logistics' section and motorcycles and other two-wheelers with a website called 'MotoPinas.com'. AutoIndustriya.com has also expanded to content creation with an active YouTube channel showing high-quality automotive video content. The brand is also active on social media channels on Facebook, Instagram, and Twitter.

The sections on the website are as follows:
Main segments
 Auto News
 Car Deals
 Car Reviews
 Feature Stories
 Auto Shows
 CARambla
 Eat/Sip/Drive
 Editor's Note
 The Inside Man
 The Parking Lot
Commercial vehicle news segments
 Transport & Logistics
 Truck & Bus News
 Truck & Bus Features
Motorsport news segments
 Motorsports & Racing News
 Motorsport Features
 Race Reports
Buyers Guide
 New Car Buyers Guide
 Auto Shop Guide
 Product Reviews
 Auto 101
 Car Financing
 Car Warranty
 Auto Insurance Basics

Events
The site has also organized several events in the past. Three of which were called 'Ignition'. The site's latest event called 'Speedfest' was also the biggest so far, attracting more than one hundred twenty cars and about two thousand people to Subic Bay International Airport. The two-day event featured a Mile-Run, a Quarter-Mile Drag Race, and Gymkhana Time Trials.
AutoIndustriya.com celebrated their 21 years with the release of their Viber sticker pack.

Awards
The site was awarded the DigitalFilipino Web Award for Best Automotive Website for two consecutive years in 2008 and 2009.

Then Associate Editor Vince Pornelos was awarded 'Best Motoring Column'  at the 2010 Henry Ford Awards. At the 2012 Henry Ford Awards  Contributing Editor Iñigo Roces was recognized as 'Best Smart Technology Feature' and runner-up for the 'Best Green Technology Feature Story'; Vince Pornelos was recognized first runner-up for the 'Automotive Online Feature' and 'Ford Go Further Feature Story' categories. Brent Co was awarded Best Online Photo at the 4th Philippine International Motor Show Media Awards.

In the 15th Henry Ford Awards held in 2016, Editor-in-Chief Vince Pornelos was awarded 'Best Automotive Road Safety Feature', while News Editor Martin Aguilar was recognized as first runner-up in the 'Automotive Online Feature' category.

In 2018, at the 17th Henry Ford Awards, Editor-in-Chief Vince Pornelos was awarded 'Best Smart Technology Feature', while Inigo Roces won the 'Best Automotive Safety Feature'.

For the 18th edition of the Henry Ford Awards, AutoIndustriya.com brought home four awards. Inigo Roces was awarded 'Best Automotive Industry Feature', while Eric Tipan won the 'Best Automotive Online Lifestyle Feature'. Dominating the photography categories, Jet Rabe won the 'Best Published Photograph' title, as Kelvin Christian Go was awarded 'Best Published Ford Photo'.

At the 19th Henry Ford Awards, AutoIndustriya.com took home five wins with EIC Vince Pornelos winning 'Best Automotive Industry Feature', Eric Tipan took home 'Best Automotive Online Lifestyle Feature', photographers cornered both photo categories where Kelvin Christian Go won 'Best Ford Automotive Photograph', while Jenna Genio was heralded 'Best Automotive Photograph' award. Last but not least, AutoIndustriya took home its first video category win with the 'Best Ford Automotive Video Feature' entered by John Barney Biscocho.

In the most recently held 20th Henry Ford Awards, Editor-in-Chief Vince Pornelos took home the 'Best Automotive Online Feature', and the 'Best Automotive Video Feature' with two other AutoIndustriya.com entries nominated as the three finalists.

Partnerships

AutoIndustriya.com is consistently an event partner of major auto shows in the Philippines. These are: the Philippine International Motor Show, Manila International Auto Show, Trans Sport Show and the Manila Auto Salon. It has also entered a partnership with Panahon. TV to provide online weather updates for Philippine motorists. The site has also partnered with the AAITF Bangkok (Automotive Aftermarket International Trade Fair) held in Thailand.

References

External links
 AutoIndustriya.com
 MotoPinas.com
 AutoIndustriya YouTube Channel

Magazines published in the Philippines
Online companies of the Philippines
Internet properties established in 2000
Mass media companies of the Philippines